The card game of Euchre has many variants, including those for two, three, five or more players. The following is a selection of notable Euchre variants.

Standard play and terminology

Two-player variants

Two-player dummy 
A normal hand is dealt out to each player along with a 3-card dummy hand to each player.  Each person picks up their dummy hand after trump has been called.  Each player must make their best five card hand out of the eight cards available.

Going alone is still an option and occurs when the calling player opts not to pick up the dummy hand.

12-card (or 11-card) 
In this version, there are no partners. Each player will end up with four hidden cards, keeping strategy very similar to the partnered-version.

A normal deck of 9-10-J-Q-K-A in all four suits is used. The dealer places a card face down in front of the other player, and then in front of the dealer, alternating until each player has a row of four face-down cards. The dealer then places a face-up card on top of each face-down card, so now each player has 8 cards. The dealer then deals four more cards to each player, which they pick up and hold in their hand.

The non-dealer looks at their 4 hand cards, 4 show cards, and the opponents 4 show cards, and bids the number of tricks they think they can take, with a minimum bid of 7. The dealer can bid higher or pass. The highest bidder sets the trump suit, and the non-dealer goes first.

Players can play any card from their hand, or any of their face-up cards. If a face-up card is played that had covered a face-down card, the face-down card is flipped over and becomes eligible for play on the next trick.

It is strategically important to remember to keep cards in the hand, as otherwise it is very easy for the opponent to lead off-suit and win. It may thus be better in cases to sacrifice a higher-value face-up card than to give up hand cards. Similarly, if out of trump cards, it may be worthwhile to sacrifice a high-value face-up card in hopes of revealing a trump card underneath.

Points are only awarded or lost for the number of tricks bid: 1 point for 7 tricks, 2 points for 8 tricks, etc., up to 6 points for all 12 tricks. The player who bid gains the points if they succeed, and loses the points if they fail. The first player to get 10 points wins the game.

In some variants, each player may be dealt a 3-card private hand with 4 sets of face up/face down cards, or a 5-card hand with 3 sets of face up/face down cards.

Three-player variants

Missing Man 

Missing Man Euchre ( George's Hand Euchre) is a three-handed Euchre tournament game of Western Wisconsin. It is also played on the gulf coast of Florida. It plays similarly to traditional four-handed Euchre.

Four 5-card Euchre hands are dealt with the fourth hand being a dummy (sometimes called George's Hand), and the top card of the remaining cards is upturned. The trump suit is called in the normal fashion, in two rounds of bidding. However, either of the players who does not call trump may exchange their hand for the dummy. If no trump is called in the first two rounds of bidding, the dealer must either call a suit (other than that of the top card) or pick up the dummy hand and call any suit (including that of the top card).

Play proceeds as normal.  The calling player scores 1 point for 3 or 4 tricks, 2 points for all 5 tricks, and 4 points for a called loner.  If the calling player fails to win the bid, the other players score 1 point each.

Since the caller has no partner, leading trump is a good strategy, as when going alone in regular Euchre.

Three-hand dummy 
Another common three-player variation is played by dealing out four hands, but with the fourth hand acting as a dummy hand (a.k.a. the dead hand, imaginary friend, George, Johann, etc.).  After calling trump, the calling player picks up the dummy hand and makes the best five-card hand for themselves out of all ten cards.  Alternatively, the caller may elect to "go alone" by not picking up the dummy hand.  The caller then plays alone against the other two players, who play as partners for that hand. The calling player scores 1 point for winning the hand, 2 points for all five tricks, or 4 points for taking all five tricks while going alone.

Variations may limit the size or utility of the dummy hand, because making the best hand from ten cards may be viewed as too advantageous. Examples include a three-card dummy or the calling player randomly choosing three cards from the dummy, then making the best hand out of eight cards.

Sneaky Steve is a variant in which the dummy hand is called "Steve".  After the 
trump is called and the 5-card dummy hand is used or discarded, the player with the 9 of diamonds (called "Sneaky Steve") may exchange it for a random card of the 3 bottom cards of the kitty (i.e.: not including the top card or a card exchanged for it).  Play then proceeds normally.

Cut-throat Euchre 

In Cut-throat Euchre, the dealing and bidding process is as normal. The caller scores 1 point for 3 or 4 tricks, 3 points for 5 tricks, and the defenders each get 2 points for 3 or more tricks.

Strategy is similar to going alone in standard Euchre.  Defenders should pay attention and keep high-value non-trump cards of the suit that their partner is not playing; this will increase the chances of taking the last trick, which is almost always a non-trump trick.

Variants:
 No 9s – Played with the nines removed from the deck, which inflates the value of all hands, requiring more care in bidding.
 Count down – With the 9s removed from the deck, players start at 300 or 500 points and play down. Points are inflated: the caller loses 10 points for 3 or 4 tricks, 50 points for all 5 tricks, and the defenders each lose 20 points for 3 or more tricks. The first player to lose all points wins the game.

Canadian 

In western New York, a three-player variation called "Canadian" is played (it is called Gyoza in Chicago and Buck Euchre in areas of the US Midwest). Four hands are dealt normally. The top kitty card is upturned and automatically becomes trump. Starting from the dealer's left, the players then have the option of exchanging their hand for the dummy hand, with their discarded hand then becoming the dummy hand available for exchange by the next player. After the dealer chooses to keep or exchange hands, the dealer then picks up the trump card and play begins.

Shooter

In Southern Ontario, a three-person version exists called "Shooter". Three eight-card hands are dealt. Players then bid to call trump, with a minimum bid of 3 tricks. The winner of the contract calls the trump suit or may call "no trump", where aces are high and all jacks are treated as off-trump coloured jacks (i.e. beat a ten but lose to a queen). Players score 1 point for each trick won. If the caller fails to achieve their contract, they lose that number of points. A player who bid all 8 tricks, called "shooter", receives an extra 4 points if successful. The game is played to 31 points.

Ghost player 

Four 5-card hands are dealt, with the extra hand going to the "ghost player". In clockwise order, players may opt to switch their hand with the ghost player's hand. The top card of the kitty is then upturned and bidding and play proceed as normal. If the caller played their dealt hand, they get 2 points for 3 or 4 tricks and 4 points for 5 tricks; but if the caller switched hands, they receive only 1 point for winning the majority of tricks. The defenders each receive 1 point each for 3 or 4 tricks, and 2 points each for all 5 tricks.

Threechre

In Threechre (sometimes pronounced "tree-ker" or "three-kree"), only three suits are used and a joker serves as the left bower, regardless of drawn suit. The dealer may opt to go alone in the first round of bidding, in which case the top card is discarded and the remaining 4 cards of the kitty are given to the dealer's opponents, who pick their best 5-card hand from the 7 cards. In scoring, 3 tricks is a clear win for 2 points, while a 2–2 tie awards each tied player 1 point. There is a −1 penalty for the caller, so that calling and losing results in −1 points, calling and tying is 0 points, and calling and winning is 1 point.

Call-partner

Call-partner is a variation for 3 to 10 players (using a deck adjusted so that the kitty will have 5 cards or less after dealing a 5-card hand to each player). The top card of the kitty is upturned and bidding proceeds as normal. The player who calls trump may call for a partner by naming a desired card. For example, if the caller names the left bower, the player with that card becomes their partner – but this is not revealed until the left bower is played. This creates an element of uncertainty as to who the partner is or whether the named card might be in the kitty.  The caller may also opt to go alone. Scoring as normal.

Euchress

Euchress discards the 9s from the deck. Dealing and bidding are as normal, but the caller can choose a partner or go alone. Scoring is the same, with play typically going to 15 points.

Four-player variations

Benny variants 
A common variant played in southwestern England pub leagues uses the standard Euchre deck with an extra card, usually a Joker or 2 of spades, called the "Benny" (or the "Bird" in Australia). This card is the highest trump no matter what suit is called. When the Benny is turned over by the dealer, the dealer must choose a suit to call as trumps before looking at his or her hand. Bidding and play then proceeds normally.

The Duchy of Cornwall lays claim to the origin of the Benny in Euchre, its usage being exported by emigrant Cornish miners in the eighteenth and nineteenth centuries.

Railroad Euchre 

There is an extension of this style wherein the 9s are removed from the deck and up to four "Bennys" are added (usually one or both jokers and/or one or both deuces). In its simplest form, with a single Benny, it is the same as the English variant (above). The Bennys are ranked trump ahead of the right bower, regardless of the suit of trump, with deuce(s) outranking jokers. If two Jokers are added, some method is achieved for establishing a "high" and a "low" Joker.

Although somewhat complicated, the addition of up to four higher-ranking trump cards makes a significant strategic impact on gameplay. The two and three Benny versions are the most common.

33-card deck 

n Guernsey (Channel Islands) the game is played with a 33 card deck incorporating 7 to Ace plus a joker as Benny. In addition, where the Benny is turned up, the dealer not only has to name the suit, he must then pick it up and play (although he may still choose whether to play alone or with his partner). Unofficial rules require the wearing of a "dealing hat" when dealing (usually a Fez) alternatively a 'dealing duck' may be placed in front of the dealer and referring to the Ace of Spades as the Death Card, regardless of trump. Tradition dictates that the Death Card should not be led on the first trick unless defending against a lone attacker as it will otherwise invariably be trumped. A cleverer lead is known as the "Brisey" which involves leading the left bower in an attempt to trick one of your opponents into a renege (a failure to correctly follow suit)if any particular player consistently reneges throughout an evenings play he / she is referred to as a 'habin'. The Brisey lead itself is named after Brian Mauger, a famous Guernsey Euchre player. If a defender has won two tricks and still has possession of the Benny then he must slap it onto his forehead as a sign of the guaranteed euchre. In an attempt to improve a poor hand a player may call a 'kezza' with what would appear to be little chance of success in the hope that his partner may assist in winning the majority of the available tricks.

Haus or Hoss 
Haus or Hoss is a variant popular in parts of upstate New York, specifically the Pennsylvania Dutch area. Two standard decks are used with the numeral cards removed to leave only the Aces and court cards. Players form two teams of two, sitting opposite one another. Deal and play are clockwise, 8 cards being dealt to each player. Beginning with eldest hand, there is one round of bidding in which players bid the number of tricks they believe their team can make, the minimum bid being four. Players must outbid any earlier bid or pass. The highest bidder wins the auction and leads to the first trick, usually with the top trump (the "right bar" or "right bauer"). The suit of the led card is the "called suit" and indicates trumps. The highest cards are the trump Jacks, followed by the Jacks of the same colour, then A K and Q. In the side suits the order is A K Q J. Players must follow suit if able; otherwise may play any card. A player who wants to play alone with the aim of taking all 8 tricks bids "Haus"; this wins the auction and the player may swap two cards with his or her partner before play begins.

Five players

One five-player variant expands the standard deck, adding the 8s and a pair of 2s (or alternatively the jokers). The 2s or jokers are the highest trump cards, whichever suit is called. Five 5-card hands are dealt and the top card of the kitty is upturned. If no other player orders a trump suit, the dealer must do so. In the special case that the top card is a 2, the dealer cannot look at their cards for the first round of bidding, in which any suit can be called. Once trump is called, the caller may select a partner by naming a card (other than a 2) or may alternatively go alone. A player holding the named card becomes the caller's partner, though this is not revealed until the named card is played. Scoring is normal. There are no added benefits if the caller wins all 5 tricks when not going alone but the named card is in the kitty (i.e.: going alone must be intentional). The game ends when a player reaches ten or more points while holding at least a one-point advantage over all other players, with various rules for breaking ties.

Six-player variants

Uneven Teams
The above rules for five-handed euchre can also be used for 6 hands by adding the 7s. The team that makes trump will usually play 2 against 4.

Triple Wild Deck

Partnerships are two teams of three players. The deck consists of 8s through aces, with the addition of the 4, 3, and 2 of spades which are (in order) the highest trumps. After dealing, there is a single card left over which serves as the top card for bidding. The game is played to 15 points, scoring 3 for euchres and sweeps, and 5 for lone calls.

32-card deck 

Partnerships are three teams of two players seated across from each other.  The deck is 32 cards, 7 through ace of each suit.  The kitty consists of only two cards.  If defenders euchre the callers, both defending teams score 2 points. The game is won when the first team scores a specific number of points (usually 10), sometimes also requiring a certain lead over either opposing partnership to avoid ties.

34-card deck 

Partnerships are two teams of three players. The deck consists of 7s through aces plus two jokers, which are the highest and second-highest trumps.

Six-suit deck 
Partnerships are three teams of two players, seated opposite. Uses a deck constructed of three red suits and three black suits, such that there is one right bower and two left bowers (the first left bower played outranks the second). Bidding, play, and scoring is as normal, with additional rules for ties:  If the calling team and another team each win two tricks, each of these partnerships score 1 point. If the two non-calling teams each win two or three tricks, each of these partnerships score 2 points. The first team to 10 points wins.

Double deck 
Partnerships are two teams of three players. Uses two standard euchre decks (48 cards); if the same card is played twice in a trick, the card which is played first is highest. Each player is dealt 8 cards. Players bid how many tricks they can get (minimum 3), with the winner calling trump. The caller may go alone normally as a "Big Shooter" or optionally as a "Little Shooter" by receiving the best card from each teammate.

Teams score 1 point for each trick won. If a team fails to make its bid, they don't receive any points and additionally lose the same number of points as their bid. Winning all 8 tricks scores an additional 4 points on a Little Shooter and 16 points on a Big Shooter. The game is won when a team has 32 points or more at the end of a turn when they called trump, or 34 points otherwise.

See also

Euchre - standard Euchre
Euchre variations - minor changes to standard Euchre
Bid Euchre - a variant form
Haus - a variant popular in upstate New York
Glossary of card game terms

References

External links

Euchre group